John Morrell may refer to:

 John Bowes Morrell (1873–1963), English author and historian
 John Morrell (rugby league), rugby league footballer who played in the 1920s
 John Morrell & Co, Sioux Falls, South Dakota meat processing company purchased by Smithfield Foods in 1995
 John Morrell, Royal Navy lieutenant, father of Arthur Fleming Morrell
 John Arthur Morrell, who became a commander and served aboard HMS Eagle during an 1806 attack on Naples, brother of Arthur Fleming Morrell